The following is a list of episodes of the Disney Channel Original Series, That's So Raven. It ran from January 17, 2003, to November 10, 2007, with 100 episodes produced spanning 4 seasons.

Series overview

Episodes

Season 1 (2003–04)

Season 2 (2003–04)

Season 3 (2004–06)

Season 4 (2006–07)

References

See also
 List of The Suite Life of Zack & Cody episodes - includes "That's So Suite Life of Hannah Montana", part two of crossover with the same name
 List of Hannah Montana episodes - includes "On the Road Again", part three of "That's So Suite Life of Hannah Montana" crossover
 List of Cory in the House episodes - includes crossover episode "That's So in the House"
 List of Raven's Home episodes

External links
 List of That's So Raven episodes at the Internet Movie Database

Lists of American children's television series episodes
Lists of American sitcom episodes
Lists of Disney Channel television series episodes
Episodes